Baza is a rural locality (a village) and the administrative center of Yavengskoye Rural Settlement, Vozhegodsky District, Vologda Oblast, Russia. The population was 576 as of 2002. There are 10 streets.

Geography 
Baza is located 20 km north of Vozhega (the district's administrative centre) by road. Pokrovskoye is the nearest rural locality.

References 

Rural localities in Vozhegodsky District